The Ho-Chunk, also known as Hoocągra or Winnebago (referred to as Hotúŋe in the neighboring indigenous Iowa-Otoe language), are a Siouan-speaking Native American people whose historic territory includes parts of Wisconsin, Minnesota, Iowa, and Illinois. Today, Ho-Chunk people are enrolled in two federally recognized tribes, the Ho-Chunk Nation of Wisconsin and the Winnebago Tribe of Nebraska.

The Winnebago Tribe of Nebraska have an Indian reservation in Nebraska. While related, the two tribes are distinct federally recognized sovereign nations and peoples, each having its own constitutionally formed government and completely separate governing and business interests. Since the late 20th century, both tribal councils have authorized the development of casinos. 

The Ho-Chunk Nation is working on language restoration and has developed a Hoocąk-language iOS app. Since 1988, it has pursued a claim to the Badger Army Ammunition Plant as traditional territory; the area has since been declared surplus, but the Ho-Chunk have struggled with changes in policy at the Department of the Interior. The department supported the Ho-Chunk claim in 1998, but in 2011 refused to accept the property on their behalf.

In 1994, to build on its revenues from casinos, the Winnebago created an economic development corporation; it has been successful and received awards as a model of entrepreneurial small business. With a number of subsidiaries, it employs more than 1400 people. It has also contributed to housing construction on the reservation. Like more than 60% of federally recognized tribes, the Winnebago legalized alcohol sales on the reservation to secure revenues that previously went to the state in taxes.

The Ho-Chunk was the dominant tribe in its territory in the 16th century with a population estimated at several thousand. Ethnologists have speculated that, like some other Siouan peoples, the Ho-Chunk may have originated along the East Coast and migrated west in pre-colonial times. Nicolas Perrot wrote that the names given to them by neighboring Algonquian peoples may have referred to their origin near an ocean.

The Ho-Chunk suffered severe population loss in the 17th century to a low of perhaps 500 individuals. This has been attributed to casualties of a lake storm, epidemics of infectious disease, and competition for resources from migrating Algonquian tribes. By the early 1800s, their population had increased to 2,900 but they suffered further losses in the smallpox epidemic of 1836. In 1990 they numbered 7,000; current estimates of total population of the two tribes are 12,000.

Name 

The Ho-Chunk speak a Siouan language, which they believe to be given to them by their creator, Mą’ųna (Earthmaker). Their native name is Ho-Chunk (or Hoocạk), which has been variously translated as "sacred voice" or "People of the Big Voice", meaning mother tongue, as in they originated the Siouan language family.

The term "Winnebago" is a term used by the Potawatomi, pronounced as "Winnipego".

The Jesuit Relations of 1659–1660 said:

Nicolas Perrot was a 17th-century French trader who believed that the Algonquian terms referred to salt-water seas, as these have a distinctive aroma compared with fresh-water lakes. An early Jesuit record says that the name refers to the origin of Le Puans near the salt water seas to the north. Algonquins also called the Winnebago, "the people of the sea". (A Native people who lived on the shores of Hudson Bay were called by the same name.)

When the explorers Jean Nicolet and Samuel de Champlain learned of the "sea" connection to the tribe's name, they were optimistic that it meant Les Puans were from or had lived near the Pacific Ocean. They hoped it indicated a passage to China via the great rivers of the Midwest.

In recent studies, ethnologists have speculated that the Hoocągra, like the other Siouan-speaking peoples, originated on the east coast of North America and gradually migrated west. Recently, several Hoocąk elders have claimed that they originated in the Midwest and that they predated the last ice age. The early 20th-century researcher H.R. Holand claimed they originated in Mexico, where they had contact with the Spanish and gained a knowledge of horses. David Lee contends the Hoocąk were once akin to the Olmec there. His evidence derived from a culture based on corn cultivation, civilization type, and mound building following the receding ice shield. However, Holand cites the records of Jonathan Carver, who lived with the Hoocągra in 1766–1768. Contact with the Spanish could have occurred along the Gulf of Mexico or the south Atlantic coast, where other Hoocąk tribes originated and lived for centuries. Others suggested that the Hoocągra originated near saltwater to explain how mid-western tribes had a knowledge of the Pacific Ocean, which they described as being located where the earth ends and the sun sets into the sea. Oral histories from a past Hoocąk orator, Wakąhaga, or Snake Skin, say that they migrated to Wisconsin from the Pacific southwest, where their endonym originally meant "People of the Big Fish", or more accurately "People of the Whale". Generally, the Hoocągra today claim their people have always lived in what is now the north central United States. Linguistic and ethnographic studies have generated other deep histories of the various Native American peoples.

History

Ho-Chunk oral history states they had always lived in their current homelands of Wisconsin, Minnesota, Iowa, Missouri, and Illinois. Their Siouan language indicates common origin with other peoples of this language group. They state their ancestors built the thousands of effigy mounds through Wisconsin and surrounding states during the Late Woodland period.

The tribe historically adopted corn agriculture at the end of the Late Woodland period as well as hunting, fishing, and gathering wild plants. They cultivated wild rice (Zizania spp.) and gathered sugar from sugar maple trees.

European contact came in 1634 with the arrival of French explorer Jean Nicolet. He wrote that the Winnebago/Ho-Chunk occupied the area around Green Bay of Lake Michigan in Wisconsin, reaching beyond Lake Winnebago to the Wisconsin River and to the Rock River in Illinois.

The oral history also indicates that in the mid-16th century, the influx of Ojibwe peoples in the northern portion of their lands caused the Ho-Chunk to move to the south of their territory. They had some friction with the tribes of the Illinois Confederacy as well as fellow Chiwere-speaking peoples splitting from the Ho-Chunk. These groups, who became the Iowa, Missouria, and Otoe tribes, moved south and west because the reduced range made it difficult for such a large population to be sustained.

Nicolet reported a gathering of approximately 5,000 warriors as the Ho-Chunk entertained him. Historians estimate that the population in 1634 may have ranged from 8,000 to more than 20,000. Between that time and the first return of French trappers and traders in the late 1650s, the population was reduced drastically. Later reports were that the Ho-Chunk numbered only about 500 people. When numerous Algonquian tribes migrated west to escape the aggressive Iroquois tribes in the Beaver Wars, they competed with the Ho-Chunk for game and resources, who had to yield to their greater numbers.

The reasons given by historians for the reduction in population vary, but they agree on three major causes: the loss of several hundred warriors in a storm on a lake, infectious disease epidemics after contact with Europeans, and attacks by the Illinois Confederacy.

The warriors were said to be lost on Lake Michigan after they had repulsed the first attack by invading the Potawatomi from what is now Door County, Wisconsin. Another says the number was 600. Another claim is that the 500 were lost in a storm on Lake Winnebago during a failed campaign against the Meskwaki, while yet another says it was in a battle against the Sauk.

Even with such a serious loss of warriors, the historian R. David Edmunds notes that it was not enough to cause the near elimination of an entire people. He suggests two additional causes. The Winnebago apparently suffered from a widespread disease, perhaps an epidemic of one of the European infectious diseases. They had no immunity to the new diseases and suffered high rates of fatalities. Ho-Chunk accounts said the victims turned yellow, which is not a trait of smallpox. Historians have rated disease as the major reason for the losses in all Native American populations.

Edmunds notes as a third cause of the population decline the following historic account: decimation by the Illinois Confederacy. The Ho-Chunk had been helped at one time by many of their enemies, in particular the Illinois Confederacy, during their time of suffering and famine, aggravated by the loss of their hunters. The Winnebago then attacked the Illinois Confederacy. Enraged, additional Illinois warriors retaliated and killed nearly all the Ho-Chunk.

After peace was established between the French and Iroquois in 1701, many of the Algonquian peoples returned to their homelands to the east. The Ho-Chunk were then relieved of that pressure on their territory and after 1741, most returned inland. From a low of perhaps less than 500, the population gradually recovered, aided by intermarriage with neighboring tribes and some of the French traders and trappers. A count from 1736 gives a population of 700; in 1806, they numbered more than 2,900. A census in 1846 reported 4,400 people but by 1848, there were reportedly 2,500. Like other Native American tribes, the Ho-Chunk suffered great losses during the smallpox epidemics of 1757–58 and 1836. In the 19th-century epidemic, they lost nearly one quarter of their population. Today the total population of the Ho-Chunk people is about 12,000.

The Black Hawk War of 1832 was fought largely on Ho Chunk land. In early 1832, White Cloud invited the Sauk band to live in the Rock River band's Illinois villages. About 1,200 Ho-Chunk, Fox, Kickapoo, and others came, from locations such as Saukenuk on the Iowa reservation, where there was little food. The arrivals included Black Sparrow Hawk, who had been a pro-British warrior in his youth.

Through a series of moves imposed by the U.S. government in the 19th century, the tribe was relocated to reservations increasingly further west: in Wisconsin, Minnesota, South Dakota, and finally Nebraska. Oral history suggests some of the tribe may have been forcibly relocated up to 13 times by the US federal government to steal land through forced treaty cession, losses estimated at 30 million acres in Wisconsin alone.

The Ho Chunk often resisted removal by staying home, or simply returning home, rather than engaging in uprisings.

The Winnebago ceded lands in Wisconsin in 1829, 1832 and 1837; further removal attempts occurred in Wisconsin in 1840, 1846, 1850, and 1873-4. 

The 1848 removal from Iowa was documented by a soldier in Morgan's Mounted Volunteers. About 2,500 people were forced to travel by wagon, on foot, and on horseback from Fort Atkinson, Iowa  to Winona, Minnesota, and thence by steamboat to the Long Prairie Reservation.  The Long Prairie Reservation, which was heavily wooded, was more suitable for logging than for farming. It was dissolved in 1855, and its residents were moved to  Blue Earth County, Minnesota. In 1863, the Ho Chunk were forced to leave Blue Earth County when a secret society organized by settlers in Mankato, "The Knights of the Forest", sent armed men to surround the Ho Chunks' prime farmland. About 2,000 Ho Chunk were moved to Camp Porter, in Mankato, and thence to Crow Creek, South Dakota. Poor conditions at Crow Creek led many Ho Chunk to leave for an Omaha reservation in Nebraska. The Winnebago Reservation was founded for the Ho Chunk in Nebraska in 1865.

Following the forced relocations, many tribe members returned to previous homes, especially in Wisconsin, despite the U.S. Army's repeated roundups and removals. The U.S. government finally allowed the Wisconsin Winnebago to settle land in the state, where they have achieved federal recognition as a tribe. The Ho-Chunk in Nebraska have gained independent federal recognition as a tribe and have a reservation in Thurston County. The Ho-Chunk Nation now has a constitution that reinforces its sovereign abilities to negotiate with the US government.

Waukon and Decorah, county seats of Allamakee and Winneshiek County, Iowa, respectively, were named after the 19th-century Ho-Chunk chief Waukon Decorah.

Culture

Before Europeans ventured into Ho-Chunk territory, the Ho-Chunk were known to hunt, farm, and gather food from local sources, including nuts, berries, roots, and edible leaves. They knew what the forest and river's edge had to give and both genders had a role in making best use of resources. With the changing seasons, Ho-Chunk families would move from area to area to find food. For example, many families would return to Black River Falls, Wisconsin, to pick berries in the summer.

Ho-Chunk women were responsible for growing, gathering, and processing food for their families, including the cultivation of varieties of corn and squash, in order to have different types through the growing season; and gathering a wide variety of roots, nuts, and berries, as well as sap from maple trees. In addition, women learned to recognize and use a wide range of roots and leaves for medicinal and herbal purposes. The maple sap was used to make syrup and candy. Women also processed and cooked game, making dried meats combined with berries to sustain their families when traveling. Tanned hides were used to make clothing and storage bags. They used most parts of the game for tools, binding, clothing, and coverings for dwellings. They were responsible for the survival of the families, caring for the children as well as elders.

The main role of the Ho-Chunk man was as a hunter – and a warrior when needed. Leaders among the men interfaced with other tribes. As hunters, they would spear fish and club them to death. The men would also hunt game such as muskrat, mink, otter, beaver, and deer. Some men learned to create jewelry and other body decorations out of silver and copper, for both men and women. To become men, boys would go through a rite of passage at puberty: they fasted for a period during which they were expected to acquire a guardian spirit; without it, their lives would be miserable.

Besides having a guardian spirit, men would also try to acquire protection and powers from specific spirits, which was done by making offerings along with tobacco. For example, a man would not go on the warpath without first performing the "war-bundle feast", which contained two parts. The first part honored the night-spirits and the second part honored the Thunderbird spirit. The blessings that these spirits gave the men were embodied in objects that together made the war-bundle. These objects could include feathers, bones, skins, flutes, and paints.

Ho-Chunk clans 
Before the US government removed the Ho-Chunk from their native land in Wisconsin, the tribe consisted of 12 clans (see table).

The clans were associated with animal spirits representing the traditional responsibilities within the nation; each clan had a role in the survival of the people. Like other Native Americans, the Ho-Chunk had rules generally requiring people to marry outside their clans. The kinship system was based in the family and gave structure to descent and inheritance rules. Although the tribe is patrilineal today, anthropologists believe they may have had a matrilineal kinship system in the 17th century before their major losses. At that time, the matriarchs of a clan would name its chief and they could reclaim the position if they disapproved of his actions. The Ho-Chunk may have shifted to the patrilineal system due to marriage into other tribes or under the influence of the male-oriented fur trade.

Today there are two federally recognized tribes of Ho-Chunk people, the Ho-Chunk Nation of Wisconsin and the Winnebago Tribe of Nebraska.

Ho-Chunk Nation

This tribe is headquartered in Black River Falls, Wisconsin. Formerly known as the Wisconsin Winnebago Tribe, they changed their name to "Ho-Chunk Nation" to take back their traditional Siouan name. They usually refer to themselves as  meaning "sacred voice people of the Pines". They also call themselves wąąkšik – "people". They are the larger of the two federally recognized Ho-Chunk tribes. 

The Ho-Chunk have established the Hoocąk Waaziija Haci Language and Culture Division, which has developed materials to teach and restore use of the Hocąk language and other elements of their culture. Among its recent innovations is the development of a Hocąk-language app for the iPhone. The Ho-Chunk have about 200 native speakers among its elders.

Of the 7,192 tribal members as of May 2011, 5,042 lived in Wisconsin. The tribes own 4,602 acres (18.625 km²) scattered across parts of 12 counties in Wisconsin and one in Minnesota. The largest concentrations are in Jackson, Clark, and Monroe counties in Wisconsin. Smaller areas lie in Adams, Crawford, Dane, Juneau, La Crosse, Marathon, Rock, Sauk, Shawano, and Wood counties in Wisconsin. The Ho-Chunk Nation also owns land in Lynwood, Illinois.

Government
The Ho-Chunk Nation established a written constitution and is governed by an elected council. , the current president is Marlon WhiteEagle.

Since the late 20th-century, the tribe operates six casinos in Wisconsin, in order to raise funds:
Ho-Chunk Gaming Wisconsin Dells in Baraboo,
Ho-Chunk Gaming Black River Falls,
Ho-Chunk Gaming Nekoosa,
Ho-Chunk Gaming Wittenberg,
Ho-Chunk Gaming Tomah, and
Ho-Chunk Gaming Madison.
In February 2013, the Beloit Common Council sold land to the Ho-Chunk Nation for a proposed casino.

The council has used revenues to enhance infrastructure, healthcare, and educational support for its people.

In 1988, the Ho-Chunk Nation filed a timely claim for transfer of the Badger Army Ammunition Plant (BAAP), which was to be declared surplus under federal regulations. As part of their former traditional territory, the property holds historical, archeological, sacred, and cultural resources important to their people. It is a 1500-acre parcel in Sauk County, Wisconsin. In 1998 the Secretary of the Interior had issued a letter to claim the land on behalf of the Ho-Chunk but in 2011, the Bureau of Indian Affairs (BIA) refused to accept the property. It was unwilling to conduct an environmental assessment due to cost.

The Ho-Chunk are continuing to pursue the case. Between 1998 and 2011, the Army spent millions of dollars in environmental assessments and cleanup to prepare the property for transfer. In 2012 the National Congress of American Indians (NCAI) passed a resolution in support of the Ho-Chunk and to encourage the BIA to accept surplus lands in trust on behalf of tribes.

Winnebago Tribe of Nebraska

The tribe has a reservation in northeastern Nebraska and western Iowa. The Winnebago Indian Reservation lies primarily in the northern part of Thurston and a small part of Dixon counties in Nebraska, with an additional portion in Woodbury County, Iowa. The total land area is 457.857 km² (176.78 sq mi).

They refer to themselves as  meaning "sacred voice people living on the Missouri River".

The Iowa portion was originally west of the Missouri River and within Nebraska boundaries. After the United States Army Corps of Engineers changed the course of the river, some of the reservation land was redefined as falling within the boundaries of Iowa. The tribe successfully argued that the land belonged to them under the terms of the deed prior to diversion of the river. This land has a postal address of Sloan, Iowa, as rural addresses are normally covered by the nearest post office.

The 2000 census reported a population of 2,588 people living on these lands. The largest community is the village of Winnebago, with others in Emerson and Thurston, Nebraska. In 2006 their enrolled population was estimated at 4,000.

The federally recognized Omaha also have a reservation in Thurston County. Together, the Native American tribes occupy the entire land area of Thurston County.

Government
The Winnebago Tribe of Nebraska has a written constitution and is governed by an elected nine-person council.

Since 1992 the Winnebago tribe has owned and operated the WinnaVegas Casino on its lands in Iowa. The tribe legalized alcohol sales to keep liquor tax revenue, earmarked for supporting individuals and families affected by alcoholism. More than 60% of federally recognized tribes in the lower 48 states have legalized alcohol sales.

In 1994 the tribe established Ho-Chunk, Inc., an economic development corporation that now employs 1400 people. Its success has earned the tribe small business organization awards. It has initiated a strong housing construction program in collaboration with federal programs. Its leaders were featured on Native American Entrepreneurs in 2009 on PBS.

Land claims 
According to Gordon Thunder (Wakąja), the Ho-Chunk have been systematically removed from their homelands, many now occupied by other tribes. The Ho-Chunk Nation of Wisconsin, which at one time consisted primarily of tribal members spread over 13 counties of Wisconsin, have a historical territorial claim in an area encompassed by a line from Green Bay to Long Prairie to St. Louis to Chicago. Some in the federal and state governments have undermined the Ho-Chunk land claims; however, repatriation activities document where many villages once stood.

Ho-Chunk people

*Angel De Cora, artist and educator
Joba Chamberlain, Major league baseball pitcher
Henry Roe Cloud, born 1884, Yale graduate, educator
Glory of the Morning, 18th-century chief
Willard LaMere, educational leader and co-founder of the Native American Educational Services (NAES) College in Chicago
Hononegah, co-founder of Rockton, Illinois
Bronson Koenig, All Big-Ten basketball player from University of Wisconsin-Madison from 2013 to 2017
Truman Lowe, artist
Red Bird, chief and leader during the 1827 Winnebago War
Mitchell Red Cloud, Jr., Korean War Medal of Honor recipient
Red Wing (also known as Lillian St. Cyr), film actress
John Raymond Rice, World War II and Korean War hero, recipient of the Bronze Star
Chief Waukon Decorah, warrior and orator
Mountain Wolf Woman, an early 19th-century convert to the Peyote religion
Chief Yellow Thunder (also known as Waun-kaun-tshaw-zee-kau)
Betsy Thunder, Traditional doctor
Sharice Davids (b. 1980), assumed office in 2019 as the U.S. representative from Kansas's 3rd congressional district, one of the first Native American women elected to Congress

See also
Ho-Chunk mythology
Winnebago language
Badger Army Ammunition Plant
Doty Island
 Native American tribes in Nebraska

Notes

References
 Pritzker, Barry M. A Native American Encyclopedia: History, Culture, and Peoples. Oxford: Oxford University Press, 2000. .
Radin, Paul The Winnebago Tribe. Lincoln: University of Nebraska Press, 1990. .
Ho-Chunk Reservation and Off-Reservation Trust Land, Wisconsin/Minnesota United States Census Bureau
Winnebago Reservation and Off-Reservation Trust Land, Nebraska/Iowa United States Census Bureau

Further reading
Loew, Patty, 2001. Indian Nations of Wisconsin: Histories of Endurance and Renewal. Madison: Wisconsin Historical Society Press.

External links

Ho-Chunk Nation, official website
Winnebago Tribe of Nebraska, official website
Hoocąk Waaziija Haci Language and Culture Division, Ho-Chunk Nation, extensive materials about language and restoration efforts
Kindscher, K., and D. Hurlburt. 1998. "Huron Smith's 'Ethnobotany of the Hocak' (Winnebago)", Economic Botany 52:352–372, includes much about traditional culture and use of plant resources
The Encyclopedia of Hočąk (Winnebago) Mythology, as told by Richard L. Dieterle
Paul Radin, Winnebago Notebooks, American Philosophical Library
Ho-Chunk Language Video produced by Wisconsin Public Television
Ho-Chunk History Video produced by Wisconsin Public Television
The Encyclopedia of Hočąk (Winnebago) Mythology

 
Great Lakes tribes
Siouan peoples
Native American tribes in Minnesota
Native American tribes in Nebraska
Native American tribes in Wisconsin
Native American tribes in Illinois
Native American tribes in Iowa
Native Americans in the American Revolution